Marnie Schulenburg (May 21, 1984 – May 17, 2022) was an American actress who was known for her role as Alison Stewart on the CBS soap opera As the World Turns (2007–2010).

Early life
Marnie Schulenburg was born in Cape Cod, Massachusetts and was of German descent. She has an older sister, Corinna, a playwright and an older brother, Allan, a music teacher. She graduated from Barnstable High School in 2002.

In May 2006, she graduated from DeSales University in Center Valley, Pennsylvania with a bachelor's degree in theater. 

In September 2006, she moved to New York City and started auditioning for acting roles. She joined Dramatists Guild of America where she took part in play reading and has also participated in The Flux Theatre Ensemble.

Career
In 2006, Schulenburg was cast in the role of Alison Stewart; she made her debut when the character made a crossover appearance on The Young and the Restless on February 22, 2007, and later debuted on As the World Turns the following month. Schulenburg and actress Adrienne Frantz were featured in the mini online soap opera titled Digital Daytime: L.A.Diaries. Schulenburg remained with As the World Turns until its final episode on September 17, 2010, becoming the longest-tenured actor in the role of Alison. For her portrayal of Alison, Schulenburg earned a Daytime Emmy Award nomination in the category of Outstanding Younger Actress in a Drama Series in 2010. In April 2020, she appeared on a virtual cast reunion hosted by Alan Locher.

Schulenburg made her film debut in the romantic comedy Made for Each Other (2009). She had guest roles on the television shows Fringe, Divorce, Manhattan Love Story, Army Wives, Canterbury's Law, Elementary and Blue Bloods. She appeared in Amazon Prime Video's series Alpha House as Crystal in the last two episodes of its first season. Schulenburg played Sherry Tanner in three episodes of comedy-drama series Royal Pains. She appeared in the Pennsylvania Shakespeare Festival theater productions of As You Like It (2006) and South Pacific (2011). She appeared in the documentary film One Night Stand (2011) alongside Cheyenne Jackson, Jesse Tyler Ferguson and Rachel Dratch. The film follows the cast for 24 hours as they compose music, write a script and lyrics and learn lines, because the show will make its one night open and close at New York City's Gramercy Theatre.

In 2013, she was cast as Jo Sullivan on ABC's soap opera One Life to Live. In 2014, she began portraying ambitious actress Peyton Adams on Tainted Dreams that premiered on YouTube on December 30, 2013 and later moved exclusively to Amazon and Amazon Prime. Created by Sonia Blangiardo, it is a "soap-within-a-soap" that follows the backstage drama of the fictional soap opera Painted Dreams. In April 2019, she made a guest star appearance as Stacy on CBS's The Good Fight.

Personal life 
Schulenburg married her boyfriend of 10 years, actor Zack Robidas, on September 15, 2013. She gave birth to their daughter, Coda Jones on December 12, 2019.

Illness and death 
In May 2020, Schulenburg revealed that she had been diagnosed with metastatic breast cancer, which doctors mistook for a mastitis diagnosis that is common to new mothers. She described her cancer as the "most insidious kind, inflammatory breast cancer which doesn’t look like typical breast cancer, more aggressive, affects younger women, and disguises itself as a breastfeeding infection." "How does one celebrate a birthday after a stage four breast cancer diagnosis in the middle of a global pandemic while raising a 5 month old?", she wrote in an Instagram post. Her friends and family members set up a GoFundMe page for her medical expenses and the goal of $75,000 was raised in October 2020. On May 17, 2022, she died from the disease at a hospital in Bloomfield, New Jersey, aged 37.

Filmography

References

External links 

1984 births
2022 deaths
21st-century American actresses
21st-century American singers
Actresses from Massachusetts
American film actresses
American people of German descent
American soap opera actresses
American television actresses
Barnstable High School alumni
Deaths from breast cancer
Deaths from cancer in New Jersey 
DeSales University alumni
People from Barnstable, Massachusetts
Singers from Massachusetts